The Brandt House, also known as Bonnet House and Richard House, is a historic house located at 614 Madison Street in Lafayette, Louisiana.

Originally built in c.1840 as a two-room Creole cottage facing south with a gallery across the front, the house was hugely remodeled in c.1880, becoming a side hall cottage facing Madison Street. Alterations were so extensive that the building dates to the 1870s for the purpose of its architectural significance. The home is one of the few Greek Revival buildings which survives in downtown Lafayette.

The house is named after William Brandt, who bought it in 1859 from Charles H. Mouton and sold it to Alfred Bonnet in 1880. It is locally known also as the Richard House, after the family who purchased it in 1940s.

See also
 National Register of Historic Places listings in Lafayette Parish, Louisiana

References

Buildings and structures in Lafayette, Louisiana
Houses on the National Register of Historic Places in Louisiana
Greek Revival houses in Louisiana
Houses completed in 1880
Houses in Lafayette Parish, Louisiana
National Register of Historic Places in Lafayette Parish, Louisiana